Dziki may refer to:

Dziki, Kuyavian-Pomeranian Voivodeship, a village in Poland
Dziki, West Pomeranian Voivodeship, a village in Poland